Brittany is a historical province of France. It may also refer to the following affiliation:
 Duchy of Brittany, an historical administrative unit
 Brittany (administrative region), the present-day administrative region of Brittany, in France, which is smaller than the historical province of Brittany

Brittany may also refer to:
 Brittany (dog), a breed of dog
 Brittany, Louisiana, a community in the United States
 French Brittany (dog), a breed of dog
 Brittany (name), a feminine name (variants include Britnee, Britney, Brittney)
 , one of a number of ships
 Brittany Apartment Building, Cincinnati, Ohio
 "Britney/Brittany", an episode of Glee

See also
 Britney (disambiguation)
 Bretagne (disambiguation)